2260 Neoptolemus  is a large Jupiter trojan from the Greek camp, approximately  in diameter. It was discovered on 26 November 1975, by astronomers at the Purple Mountain Observatory in Nanking, China. The dark D-type asteroid is one of the 50 largest Jupiter trojans and has a rotation period of 8.18 hours. It was named after Neoptolemus from Greek mythology.

Orbit and classification 

Neoptolemus is a dark Jovian asteroid orbiting in the leading Greek camp at Jupiter's  Lagrangian point, 60° ahead of its orbit in a 1:1 resonance (see Trojans in astronomy). It is also a non-family asteroid in the Jovian background population.

This asteroid orbits the Sun at a distance of 5.0–5.4 AU once every 11 years and 10 months (4,326 days; semi-major axis of 5.2 AU). Its orbit has an eccentricity of 0.04 and an inclination of 18° with respect to the ecliptic.

Physical characteristics 

In the SDSS-based taxonomy, Neoptolemus is a dark D-type asteroid. It has also been characterized as a D-type by the survey conducted by Pan-STARRS, while in the Tholen classification the body's spectral type is ambiguous, closest to a D-type and somewhat similar to a T-type asteroid, with a spectrum flagged as unusual and moderately noisy (DTU:).

Rotation period 

In August 1995, and in March 2002, two rotational lightcurves of Neoptolemus were obtained from photometric observations by Italian astronomer Stefano Mottola using the Bochum 0.61-metre Telescope at La Silla Observatory, Chile, and the 1.52-meter Loiano Telescope at the Observatory of Bologna, Italy, respectively. Lightcurve analysis gave a well-defined rotation period of 8.180 hours and a brightness variation of 0.20 and 0.32 magnitude, respectively.

Follow-up observation by Robert Stephens at the Center for Solar System Studies in 2015, and 2016, gave a concurring period of 8.18 and 8.199 hours with a corresponding amplitude of 0.14 and 0.03 magnitude.

Diameter and albedo 

According to the surveys carried out by the Infrared Astronomical Satellite IRAS, the Japanese Akari satellite and the NEOWISE mission of NASA's Wide-field Infrared Survey Explorer, Neoptolemus measures between 71.65 and 81.28 kilometers in diameter and its surface has an albedo between 0.051 and 0.0650.

The Collaborative Asteroid Lightcurve Link adopts the results obtained by IRAS, that is, an albedo of 0.0650 and a diameter of 71.65 kilometers based on an absolute magnitude of 9.31.

Naming 

This minor planet was named from Greek mythology after the Greek warrior Neoptolemus, son of Achilles and Deidameia, who was brought to Troy by Odysseus in the last year of the Trojan War. Neoptolemus was one of the Greeks who were hiding in the wooden Trojan Horse. He brutally killed King Priam and several other princes during the destruction of the city of Troy.

The official naming citation was published by the Minor Planet Center on 1 August 1981.

Notes

References

External links 
 Asteroid Lightcurve Database (LCDB), query form (info )
 Dictionary of Minor Planet Names, Google books
 Discovery Circumstances: Numbered Minor Planets (1)-(5000) – Minor Planet Center
 
 

002260
002260
Named minor planets
002260
19751126